Snowbound is a 1948 British thriller film directed by David MacDonald and starring Robert Newton, Dennis Price, Stanley Holloway,  Herbert Lom, Marcel Dalio and Guy Middleton and introducing Mila Parély.  Based on the 1947 novel The Lonely Skier by Hammond Innes, the film concerns a group of people searching for treasure hidden by the Nazis in the Alps following the Second World War. The film's sets were designed by the art directors Maurice Carter and George Provis.

Plot
British film director Derek Engles recognises Neil Blair, an extra on his set, whilst he prepares to shoot a scene. He pulls him out and goes for a private chat.

In order to investigate some intelligence that he has picked up in Italy, Engles offers Blair a job as he trusts him (he used to be Blair's commanding officer). He wants Blair to inform him on the activities of everyone who stays at a ski lodge, whilst posing as a scriptwriter. Blair accepts this offer and travels to the Italian Alps where he meets the cameraman Joe Wesson, who is part of the set up to look as if they are making a film, although Wesson is unaware there is no real film planned.

A hotel in the valley directs them to a mountain top lodge where they organise extra rooms. However, at this lodge, Aldo, the innkeeper, tells Blair there are no rooms available. They force their way upstairs and encounter Stefano Valdini, who is staying as a guest. He helps them to overcome the language barrier and get a room each. Back down in the bar they both encounter another man who claims to have booked a room but has been told by Aldo none are available: Wesson tells him to just go upstairs and claim an empty room he has seen at the end of the corridor. At a later point he introduces himself as Gilbert Mayne. Blair soon encounters the Comtessa Forelli through Valdini. He claims to have met her before in Naples but she denies this. He next meets a Greek named Keramikos who also arrives the same evening.

When Blair makes his first report, Engles is particularly interested that the lodge is to be auctioned off the next day. The proprietor of a nearby hotel tells Blair that the auction is rigged in his favour, but instead there is a heated bidding war, with a lawyer for an unknown party making an excessive winning bid.

Keramikos tells Blair that he knows he is not really writing a script and also claims that Mayne was a deserter from the British Army who worked for him in Greece. Blair begins falling in love with the Comtessa, who admits her real name is Carla Rometta. Also, Blair observes Keramikos speaking German with another man, understanding the conversation as he speaks a degree of German himself.

The next day Mayne invites Blair to go skiing. When Blair is made to crash by Mayne and is knocked unconscious, Mayne leaves him behind in the freezing snow and just reports by telephone to Wesson that Blair is missing. Carla overhears and telephones Mancini, who organises a search party and Blair is rescued.

Engles arrives at the lodge, just before a snowstorm that leaves all the parties stranded for the night. At dinner, Engles confirms he was a colonel in British Intelligence and identifies Keramikos as Von Kellerman, a Gestapo special agent based in Venice. When Italy was being over-run by the Allies, Kellerman was ordered to transport the gold reserves of the Bank of Italy to Germany. He assigned the task to Captain Heinrich Stelben, unaware Stelben was involved with Carla Rometta. At Carla's urging, Stelben left the gold at the lodge and, after shooting his own men, reported he had been ambushed. One of the men is only wounded and Kellerman learns of the gold's whereabouts, which he wants to finance the rebuilding of a new fascist Germany.

When Carla attacks Mayne after learning that he had agreed to kill her and Valdini (and that it was Mayne who had paid the 4.5m lira to buy the lodge at auction), he knocks her unconscious. Valdini throws a knife at him but misses and Mayne shoots him dead. Mayne is knifed in the back by Aldo on Kellerman's order. Kellerman produces a pistol, has Carla locked up, and orders the Englishmen to dig for the gold in the cellar. Mayne comes to and tries to free Carla but knocks over a lamp that sets the building on fire, then succumbs. When no gold is found, Kellerman does not believe that Engles does not know where it is and shoots him. In the ensuing fight, Wesson drags the unconscious Blair out of the basement. The burning lodge collapses on the others. Carla reveals that she knows where the gold is but, cradling Blair, declares she will never reveal its location, as it has caused too many deaths.

Cast
 Robert Newton as Derek Engles 
 Dennis Price as Neil Blair 
 Stanley Holloway as Joe Wesson
 Herbert Lom as Von Kellerman, alias Keramikos  
 Marcel Dalio as Stefano Valdini
 Mila Parély as Carla Rometta
 Willy Fueter as Aldo, innkeeper
 Guy Middleton as Gilbert Mayne
 Richard Molinas as Mancini, rental agent
 Catherina Ferraz as Emilia, innkeeper's wife
 Gilbert Davis as Commissionaire
 Massino Coen as Auctioneer
 Rositer Shepherd as Lawyer
 Lionel Grose as Corporal Holtz 
 William Price as Stelben
 Zena Marshall as Italian Girl

Production
Hammond Innes' novel The Lonely Skier was published in 1947. Film rights were bought by Sydney Box at Gainsborough Studios. The film involved location shooting in the French Alps. A unit was sent to shoot exteriors in the Alps while director David MacDonald finished Good Time Girl for Gainsborough.

Studio filming at the Lime Grove Studios in Shepherd's Bush took place in July 1947.

Reception

Critical
The March 1948 Variety review was not especially favourable, stating that the "Main failing of the yarn is that situations do not thrill sufficiently", and "For the romantic interest Mila Parely was imported from Paris, an experiment difficult to justify by results." The Los Angeles Times reviewer in February 1949 wrote that "the British flair for making gripping spine chillers explodes excitingly" in the film.

Halliwell's Film Guide considers it "a rather foolish story which provides little in the way of action but at least assembles a fine crop of character actors." Radio Times reviewer Tony Sloman wrote that the film "too often betrays its pulp novel roots among resolutely studio-bound snow", although " the cast is splendid". The director, when the characters are trapped, achieves "a fine sense of claustrophobia".

Box-office
By July 1953, the film earned a net revenue of £120,000.

References

External links

1940s adventure thriller films
1940s spy thriller films
British black-and-white films
British adventure thriller films
British spy thriller films
Films based on British novels
Films based on works by Hammond Innes
Films directed by David MacDonald (director)
Films set in the Alps
Films set in London
Films set in Venice
Treasure hunt films
Gainsborough Pictures films
Films about filmmaking
Films shot at Lime Grove Studios
1940s English-language films
1940s British films